Margaret Moffat born Margaret Liddell Linck (7 January 1873 – 19 February 1943) was a British actress and suffragette. She was amongst the first Scottish suffragettes to be arrested. She appeared in several films including a minor part in Alfred Hitchcock's film Saboteur.

Life
Unlike many of her Scottish-born siblings, Moffatt was born in Spittal in northern England. She was the last but one of seven children born to Gottlob and Margaret Liddell (Dowie) Linck. Moffat had a talent for singing. After leaving school, she was a drapery salesperson before deciding to become an actress. Moffat was sent as a Scottish delegate to the "Women's Parliament". She was amongst over 50 who were arrested in February 1907 after the suffragettes demonstrated at the House of Commons. She and Annie Fraser were the first and second suffragettes to be arrested who were Scottish. Moffat and others were arrested and were given a fine. Moffat refused to pay and was sentenced to two weeks in Holloway Prison.

Later that year, her husband Graham Moffat, who, like her, was also an active suffragette and actor, founded an organisation for men who supported women's suffrage Men's League for Women's Suffrage .

Moffat appeared in a number of films, including My Gal Sal and Ringside Maisie under the name "Margaret Moffat".

Moffatt and her husband emigrated to South Africa in 1933, but she continued to appear in US films including a minor part in Alfred Hitchcock's film Saboteur. She died in Cape Town in February 1943.

Filmography

References

External links 

1873 births
1943 deaths
Actors from Northumberland
Scottish film actresses
Scottish suffragists
19th-century Scottish actresses
20th-century Scottish actresses
Scottish emigrants to South Africa
Women's Social and Political Union
19th-century Scottish women
20th-century Scottish women
People associated with Glasgow